Saint-Cyr-en-Val is a commune in the Loiret department in north-central France. The writer Michèle Desbordes (1940–2006) was born in Saint-Cyr-en-Val.

Demographics

History
 A religious community of canons took place in this city in 1002.
 Jeanne of Arc came in this city on April 29, 1429.

Twin town
Saint-Cyr-en-Val is twinned with  Bliesen, Germany

Economy
Around 80 companies are located in the industrial estate "La Sausaye".

Places to see
 Château de la Motte (La Motte Castle)
 Château de Morchêne and its forest

 Saint Sulpice Church

See also
 Communes of the Loiret department

References

External links

  Official Web site

Orléans
Communes of Loiret